GPR156 (G protein-coupled receptor 156), is a human gene which encodes a G protein-coupled receptor belonging to metabotropic glutamate receptor subfamily.  By sequence homology, this gene was proposed as being a possible GABAB receptor subunit, however when expressed in cells alone or with other GABAB subunits, no response to GABAB ligands could be detected.  Therefore, the function of this protein remains to be elucidated. In vitro studies on GPR156 constitutive activity revealed a high level of basal activation and coupling with members of the Gi/Go heterotrimeric G protein family.

References

Further reading

G protein-coupled receptors